The FIBT World Championships 1999 took place in Cortina d'Ampezzo, Italy (Bobsleigh) and Altenberg, Germany (Skeleton). Cortina hosted the championships for the ninth time, previously doing so in 1937 (Two-man), 1939 (Four-man), 1950, 1954, 1960, 1966, 1981, and 1989 (Bobsleigh). Altenberg hosted the championship event for the third time, doing so previously in 1991 (Bobsleigh) and 1994 (Skeleton).

Two man bobsleigh

Ranzi replaced the injured Costa after the first heat of this event.

Four man bobsleigh

The French earned its first ever gold medal at the championships.

Men's skeleton

Shea is the first American to win a world championship since 1959.

Medal table

References
2-Man bobsleigh World Champions
4-Man bobsleigh World Champions
Men's skeleton World Champions

IBSF World Championships
1999 in skeleton
Sport in Cortina d'Ampezzo
1999 in bobsleigh
1999 in Italian sport
Sport in Altenberg, Saxony
International sports competitions hosted by Germany
International sports competitions hosted by Italy
Bobsleigh in Italy
1999 in German sport
Bobsleigh in Germany
Skeleton in Germany
1990s in Saxony

de:Skeleton-Weltmeisterschaft 1999